Walid al-Kubaisi (9 February 1958 – 31 July 2018) was a Norwegian-Iraqi author, journalist, translator, film director and government scholar. He notably criticised the alleged influence of the Muslim Brotherhood in the documentary film  Frihet, likhet og det muslimske brorskap (Freedom, Equality and the Muslim Brotherhood). He was an engineer by education.

Personal life and career
Al-Kubaisi was born in Baghdad, Iraq, and received a degree in engineering at the University of Baghdad. He emigrated from the country to Norway as a political refugee in 1981 owing to war. He regarded himself as a "secular Muslim".

In addition to writing non-fiction books, he translated Arabic poetry to Norwegian: poems by Faisal Hashmi in 2008 and by Eftikhar Ismaeil in 2010.

He was nominated to the Brage Prize in 1996.

He wrote the script for the 2010 documentary Frihet, likhet og det muslimske brorskap (Freedom, Equality and the Muslim Brotherhood) which he directed together with Per Christian Magnus.

Views
Al-Kubaisi argued that the hijab was a political uniform for the militant Islamist movement. He maintained, that if Islamists were to be successful in making the hijab synonymous with Islam, they would have achieved a victory in the West which they had not been able to accomplish in Muslim countries. He also claimed that the hijab was only created in the 1980s after Ayatollah Khomeini's Iranian revolution, and that it, unlike national Islamic dresses such as the burqa, is a dress exclusively created for the universal political Islamist movement.

He claimed that Tariq Ramadan was an Islamist, who "spoke with two tongues": smoothly and articulate in the West, yet purely Islamist in the Muslim community and the suburbs. He held that Ramadan sought to Islamize the West, but in a more patient manner than the likes of Osama bin Laden.

He believed that the Muslim Brotherhood was the "mother organization" for the world's Islamist political ideology. He said that the Muslim Brotherhood had a plan to conquer Europe by the hijab, high birth rates and democracy; Islamists were exploiting Western democracy to reach their own anti-democratic goals. His 2010 documentary Frihet, likhet og det muslimske brorskap discussed this, in which he also interviewed several Arab intellectuals who espoused his views. He also claimed that notable Norwegian Muslims such as Mohammad Usman Rana, Lena Larsen and Basim Ghozlan represented the ideology of the Brotherhood in Norway, and that Abid Raja of the Norwegian Liberal Party was a "running boy" for Islamists.

He has been described by Sindre Bangstad and Mohammad Usman Rana as a "propagator of Eurabia-views", and that his documentary echoed "Eurabia-literature". In February 2011, al-Kubaisi participated in a meeting hosted by Stop Islamisation of Norway where he held a speech, after having established contacts with the organisation since 2004.

Works

Books
Allahs lille brune : Koranen og profetens ord i utvalg, editors Walid al-Kubaisi and Ronnie Johanson, Religionskritisk forlag, 2004, 
Min tro, din myte. Aventura, 1996
Sinbads verden. Children's book. Pantagruel, 1997
Gleden er ikke mitt yrke. Pantagruel, 1998
Halvmånens hemmeligheter. Pantagruel, 1998
Rasisme forklart for barn : en bok for barn i alle aldre, og med alle hudfarger, Pantagruel, 2001,

Documentary films
 Frihet, likhet og Det muslimske brorskap, 2010

Articles (selection) 
 Vestens bin Laden (Aftenposten, 01.04.03)
 Islamforskerne har sviktet (Aftenposten, 03.12.03)
 Ytringsfrihetens grenser og islamforskernes dilemma (Aftenposten, 15.12.03)
 Den sanne historien om slør og skaut i islam (Aftenposten, 03.02.04)
 Iraks skakkjørte grunnlov (Aftenposten, 24.10.05)
 Integrering er å være trygg (Aftenposten, 08.06.06)
 Wergelands toleranse (Aftenposten, 03.05.08)

References

External links 
Articles by Walid al-Kubaisi at HonestThinking.org

1958 births
2018 deaths
Counter-jihad activists
Writers from Baghdad
Norwegian writers
Former Muslim critics of Islam
Iraqi emigrants to Norway
Translators from Arabic
Norwegian film directors
Refugees in Norway
Norwegian critics of Islam
20th-century Norwegian translators